Roger Casamajor (born 17 December 1976 in La Seu d'Urgell) is a Spanish television, theater and film actor.

Life
He began his acting career in the theater in  Andorra training as part of the company Somhiteatre and he traveled through Catalonia  with a number of plays like The Shawl (David Mamet), A Respectable Wedding (Bertold Brecht), or Farses Medievals. He later moved to Barcelona to continue with acting studies in the Col.legi of Theatre and the Institut del Teatre.

He makes his film debut film in 2000 playing the lead in Agusti Villaronga's  The Sea.
Casamajor has also appears in television in Catalonia like : Temps de silenci (2001), Angels sants (2006) and Fons Sea (2006–07), besides continuing with his theater work in plays like The Tinent d'Inishmore, Carnival, etc.).

Notes

External links
 
 

1976 births
Spanish male film actors
Spanish male television actors
Living people
People from La Seu d'Urgell